Alejandro "Álex" Barrera García (born 12 May 1991) is a Spanish professional footballer who plays for J2 League club FC Ryukyu as a central midfielder.

Club career
Born in Oviedo, Asturias, Barrera joined neighbouring Sporting de Gijón's youth academy in 1998, aged seven. He made his senior debut with the reserve team on 21 March 2010 against CD Toledo, and went on to be a regular starter for the reserves in the following Segunda División B seasons.

On 19 August 2012, Barrera made his first official appearance with the main squad, starting in a 2–0 defeat at CD Numancia in the Segunda División. In March 2013, he renewed his contract with Sporting until 2016.

Barrera scored his first competitive goal on 1 September 2013, the second in a 3–0 home win over RCD Mallorca. He contributed 11 matches – four starts – and one goal in the 2014–15 campaign, as the club returned to La Liga after a three-year absence; his maiden appearance in the competition took place on 30 December 2015, when he came on as a late substitute in the 2–0 away loss to SD Eibar.

On 11 July 2016, Barrera signed a two-year contract with Real Zaragoza of the second division. On 31 August of the following year, after being sparingly used, he moved to division three side Extremadura UD, helping achieve a first-ever promotion to the former tier in 2018.

Barrera scored the equaliser in a 1–1 away draw against Real Oviedo on 19 August 2018, netting Extremadura's maiden goal in the second division. The following 31 January, however, he terminated his contract with the club.

Honours
Bengaluru
Indian Super League: 2018–19

References

External links

1991 births
Living people
Spanish footballers
Footballers from Oviedo
Association football midfielders
La Liga players
Segunda División players
Segunda División B players
Sporting de Gijón B players
Sporting de Gijón players
Real Zaragoza players
Extremadura UD footballers
Barakaldo CF footballers
CD Atlético Baleares footballers
Algeciras CF footballers
Indian Super League players
Bengaluru FC players
J2 League players
FC Ryukyu players
Spanish expatriate footballers
Expatriate footballers in India
Expatriate footballers in Japan
Spanish expatriate sportspeople in India
Spanish expatriate sportspeople in Japan